Carmelo Goyenechea Urrusolo (18 June 1898 - 10 November 1984) was a Spanish footballer. He competed in the men's tournament at the 1924 Summer Olympics.

Club career
Born in Bilbao in 1898, he began playing for his hometown club SD Deusto until 1921, when he signed for Athletic Bilbao. He played with them for the next eight seasons, becoming one of the team's vital components and helping them win five Biscay Championships and a Copa del Rey in 1923, defeating CD Europa 1-0 in the final with a goal from Travieso. For several years he served as the Athletic captain.

He retired after playing in the first season of La Liga in 1929, in which he played 15 games and scored 6 goals.

International career
He earned 10 caps for Spain, making his debut in Lisbon against Portugal on 17 December 1922, and it was at that same venue and against those opponents that Carmelo would score his first international goal three years later, in a 2–0 win on 17 May 1925. He scored twice more for Spain, including the winner in a 1–0 victory over Hungary on 4 October 1925.

As an Athletic Bilbao player, he was eligible to play for the Biscay representative team, being part of the squad that participated in the Prince of Asturias Cup tournaments in the early 20s, scoring once in the 1923–24 edition as Biscay beat Asturias 4–2, thus reaching the semi-finals where they were eliminated by Catalonia due to an early goal from Cristóbal Martí.

International goals

Spain
Spain score listed first, score column indicates score after each Carmelo goal.

Biscay
Biscay score listed first, score column indicates score after each Carmelo goal.

Honours

Club
Athletic Bilbao

Copa del Rey:
Winners (1) 1923

Biscay Championship:
Winners (5) 1923, 1924, 1926, 1928 and 1929

References

External links
 

1898 births
1984 deaths
Spanish footballers
Spain international footballers
Olympic footballers of Spain
Footballers at the 1924 Summer Olympics
Footballers from Bilbao
Association football forwards
Athletic Bilbao footballers
La Liga players